Cosmo Stafford Crawley (27 May 1904 – 10 February 1989) was an English cricketer, rackets player and real tennis player.

Early life
Crawley was the eldest son of Arthur Stafford Crawley, then a curate at St Luke's, Chelsea. He was educated at Harrow and Magdalen College, Oxford.

Cricket
Crawley was a right-handed batsman and a medium pace bowler. He made his first-class debut during the 1923 County Championship season for Hampshire against Oxford University. This was his only match for the county. Between 1924 and 1925, Crawley played for Oxford University, playing two matches for them. In 1929 after a four-year break from the game, Crawley joined Middlesex, making one appearance for the county against Oxford University. As well as representing the aforementioned teams, Crawley also played for the Free Foresters and the Harlequins cricket team. Crawley played in four first-class matches altogether – two of them for Oxford University and two against Oxford University.

Rackets and real tennis
Crawley played rackets for Harrow, and both rackets and real tennis for Oxford. He won the British amateur rackets doubles championship in 1936 and 1937 with J.C.F. Simpson, and in 1939 and 1946 with J.H. Pawle. He and Pawle also won the 1939 amateur real tennis doubles, beating the 3rd and 4th Lord Aberdares, then aged 54 and 20, in the final.

Later life
Crawley joined the insurance broking firm of C.T. Bowring & Co. in 1925 and was a director 1934–67 and a consultant to the firm 1967–73. He was an underwriting member of Lloyd's. At the outbreak of World War II he was given an emergency commission in the Coldstream Guards and served until 1945. He died in Westminster, London, on 10 February 1989.

References

External links
Cosmo Crawley at Cricinfo
Cosmo Crawley at CricketArchive
Matches and detailed statistics for Cosmo Crawley at CricketArchive

1904 births
1989 deaths
20th-century British businesspeople
Alumni of Magdalen College, Oxford
British Army personnel of World War II
British businesspeople in insurance
Coldstream Guards officers
Cricketers from Chelsea, London
English cricketers
English racquets players
English real tennis players
Free Foresters cricketers
Hampshire cricketers
Harlequins cricketers
Middlesex cricketers
Oxford University cricketers
People educated at Harrow School